Pak Elektron Football Club is a Pakistani football club based in Lahore, Punjab. The club last competed in 2011–12 Pakistan Premier League, when they were relegated at the end of the season. 

Football clubs in Pakistan
Works association football clubs in Pakistan
Football in Lahore
2007 establishments in Pakistan
Association football clubs established in 2007